The 2004 Yamaguchi gubernatorial election was held on 8 August 2004 to elect the next governor of , a prefecture of Japan in the Chūgoku region of the main island of Honshu.

Candidates 
The candidates were:
Sekinari Nii, 61, elected in 1996 and 2000, endorsed by LDP, DPJ and New Komeito.
Toshiki Fukue, 63, former chairman of the prefectural chapter of the Labour federation, for the JCP.

Results

References 

2004 elections in Japan
Yamaguchi gubernational elections